Kozdere can refer to:

 Kozdere, Yenişehir
 Qozdərə